Alexander Anthony Fisher (born 30 June 1990) is an English professional footballer who plays as a forward for Yeovil Town.

Club career

Oxford United
Born in London and educated at Abingdon School, Fisher played youth football with Oxford United. After impressing in the youth and reserve teams, he was promoted to the senior squad.

Fisher scored his first senior goal in January 2008 at 17 years old in a 4–0 home league win against Altrincham.

Fisher joined Southern League team Brackley Town in March 2008 on loan, scoring three goals in five starts. Another loan to Oxford City followed in early 2009, where he netted 12 goals in 16 games.

Europe
After being released by Oxford United, Fisher joined the Glenn Hoddle Academy in Spain, which aimed to offer a route back to professional football for players released by their clubs. During his time at the academy, he received coaching from Graham Rix, Dave Beasant and Nigel Spackman. In September 2010, the academy took over Spanish club Jerez Industrial in the fourth-tier Tercera División, giving Fisher the opportunity to play senior football. He went on to make 21 league appearances, scoring 11 goals, but could not prevent relegation after the club received a points deduction. By the end of the season the academy had cut ties with Jerez Industrial and relocated to the UK.

In March 2012, Fisher signed for Belgian Second Division side KVK Tienen until the end of the season. He played nine games in all competitions, scoring once, but suffered a second successive relegation after losing in the play-offs to UR La Louvière Centre.

Fisher spent the next season with K.R.C. Mechelen in the Belgian Third Division, scoring seven goals in 30 appearances in all competitions. The team finished second in the league, falling short in the promotion play-offs against A.S. Verbroedering Geel. 

In July 2013, Fisher moved up a division, signing for K.S.K. Heist. He made two appearances for the club.

After just seven weeks with KSK Heist, Fisher joined Italian team A.C. Monza Brianza 1912, playing in the fourth-tier Lega Pro Seconda Divisione.

Mansfield Town
On 4 June 2014 Fisher returned to England, signing for Mansfield Town in League Two. He scored his first goal for the club in the League Cup against Sheffield United. He was released by Mansfield at the end of the 2014–15 season.

Torquay United
On 5 August 2015, Fisher signed for National League team Torquay United. Fisher scored on his debut in a 1–0 win over Macclesfield Town, and went on to score another winning goal in a 3–2 win against Halifax Town a week later. In December 2015 Fisher was released by the club, after requesting his contract be terminated for personal reasons.

Inverness Caledonian Thistle
On 9 January 2016, Fisher signed for Scottish Premiership club Inverness Caledonian Thistle on a deal until the end of the season, with an option for the club to extend that by another year. However, he made just three substitute appearances before chipping a bone in his ankle, ruling him out for the season. He signed a further six-month contract with the club in May 2016. In November 2016, his contract was extended to the end of the season. In total, he scored eight goals in 28 games in all competitions for the club.

Motherwell
After Inverness's relegation from the Premiership, Fisher signed a two-year contract with Motherwell in June 2017. He failed to score a goal in 19 appearances for Motherwell, and was released from his contract in January 2018.

Yeovil Town
Fisher signed for EFL League Two side Yeovil Town on 26 January 2018, making his debut in the FA Cup against Manchester United. At the end of the 2018–19 season, Fisher was released by Yeovil following the club's relegation from the Football League.

Exeter City
On 25 June 2019, Fisher signed for League Two side Exeter City. He scored his first goal for the club in November, in a 1–1 draw against Cambridge United in the first round of the FA Cup. His first league goal for the club came in December, in a 3–2 win against Northampton Town.

On 12 May 2021, it was announced that Fisher would leave Exeter at the end of the season, following the expiry of his contract.

Newport County
On 14 August 2021, Fisher signed for League Two side Newport County on a one-year contract. He made his debut for Newport on the same day as a second-half substitute in a 2–1 defeat against Mansfield Town. Fisher scored his first goal for Newport in a 1–0 win over Tranmere Rovers on 21 August 2021. He was released by Newport County at the end of the 2021–22 season.

Yeovil Town
On 14 July 2022, Fisher returned to National League club Yeovil Town on a two-year deal.

Career statistics

See also
 List of Old Abingdonians

References

External links

Footballers from Westminster
Oxford City F.C. players
Oxford United F.C. players
Brackley Town F.C. players
1990 births
Living people
K.V.K. Tienen-Hageland players
K.R.C. Mechelen players
Mansfield Town F.C. players
A.C. Monza players
National League (English football) players
K.S.K. Heist players
Inverness Caledonian Thistle F.C. players
Torquay United F.C. players
People educated at Abingdon School
Scottish Professional Football League players
Motherwell F.C. players
Yeovil Town F.C. players
Exeter City F.C. players
Newport County A.F.C. players
English Football League players
English expatriate footballers
English expatriate sportspeople in Belgium
English expatriate sportspeople in Spain
English expatriate sportspeople in Italy
Association football forwards
Challenger Pro League players
Tercera División players
English footballers